Titusville Airport  is a city-owned public airport three miles west of Titusville, in Crawford County, Pennsylvania. The National Plan of Integrated Airport Systems for 2011–2015 categorized it as a general aviation facility.

Facilities
Titusville Airport covers 204 acres (83 ha) at an elevation of 1,600 feet (488 m). Its one runway, 1/19, is 4,902 by 75 feet (1,494 x 23 m) asphalt.

In the year ending October 21, 2011 the airport had 9,506 aircraft operations, average 26 per day: 99.9% general aviation and 0.1% military. 18 aircraft were then based at the airport: 72% single-engine, 22% ultralight, and 6% multi-engine.

References

External links 
 Titusville Airport (6G1) at Pennsylvania DOT Bureau of Aviation
 Aerial view in April 1993 from USGS The National Map
 

Airports in Pennsylvania
Transportation buildings and structures in Crawford County, Pennsylvania